The Jeannette City School District is a small urban school district in Southwestern Pennsylvania. It is located in Westmoreland County and is surrounded by the Penn-Trafford and Hempfield Area School Districts. The district consists of two schools, McKee Elementary School (PK-6) and the Jeannette Junior-Senior High School (7-12).

Schools
Jeannette McKee Elementary School
Jeannette Junior/Senior High School

References

External links
 

School districts in Westmoreland County, Pennsylvania
Education in Pittsburgh area
School districts established in 1888